Fincastle is a town in Botetourt County, Virginia, United States. The population was 755 at the 2020 census. It is the county seat of Botetourt County.

Fincastle is part of the Roanoke Metropolitan Statistical Area.

History
The town of Fincastle was originally settled by Scotch-Irish and German immigrants from Pennsylvania who arrived in the region in the mid-18th century. John Miller erected a sawmill which became the nucleus of the early village of Fincastle. In 1770, Botetourt County was separated from Augusta County, and Miller's home was selected as the meeting place for the court. Two years later, Israel Christian donated  of land and laid out the streets and lots for the new town of Fincastle. The town's name was selected to honor George, Lord Fincastle, the eldest son of Virginia's Lieutenant Governor, Lord Dunmore.

In 1773, the first log courthouse was built on the designated court square at the center of Fincastle. Around the same time, a brick church was constructed on land donated by Israel Christian to serve as the established (Anglican) house of worship for the town. The church closed after the disestablishment of the Anglican Church in Virginia during the Revolutionary War and was later occupied by Presbyterians who rebuilt the structure to its present Greek Revival style. By the early-19th century, the village had grown into an important regional center of commerce, especially for the wool industry, aided by the construction of taverns, hotels, and shops. A second courthouse was erected in 1818 and replaced by a third, a larger brick structure of Greek Revival style in 1850. This courthouse continues to serve Botetourt County today, having been rebuilt after a disastrous fire in 1970.

The Bowyer-Holladay House, Breckinridge Mill, Fincastle Historic District, Greenfield, Hawthorne Hall, Prospect Hill, Santillane, Wheatland Manor, and Wiloma are listed on the National Register of Historic Places.

Geography
Fincastle is located at  (37.499421, -79.876674).

In May 2018, a boundary line adjustment increased the town's total area from 0.2 square mile (0.6 km2) to 2.06 square miles (5.32 km2)

Demographics

At the 2000 census there were 359 people, 129 households, and 83 families living in the town. The population density was 1,480.8 people per square mile (577.5/km2). There were 142 housing units at an average density of 585.7 per square mile (228.4/km2).  The racial makeup of the town was 89.69% White, 7.52% African American, 0.28% Native American, 0.28% Asian, 1.67% from other races, and 0.56% from two or more races. Hispanic or Latino of any race were 1.95%.

Of the 129 households 27.1% had children under the age of 18 living with them, 51.9% were married couples living together, 10.1% had a female householder with no husband present, and 34.9% were non-families. 32.6% of households were one person and 13.2% were one person aged 65 or older. The average household size was 2.39 and the average family size was 3.04.

The age distribution was 19.8% under the age of 18, 11.1% from 18 to 24, 32.3% from 25 to 44, 24.2% from 45 to 64, and 12.5% 65 or older. The median age was 39 years. For every 100 females there were 117.6 males. For every 100 females age 18 and over, there were 126.8 males.

The median household income was $33,438 and the median family income  was $54,688. Males had a median income of $32,500 versus $21,563 for females. The per capita income for the town was $19,954. None of the families and 2.3% of the population were living below the poverty line, including no under eighteens and 10.2% of those over 64.

Notable people
 Jacob Ammen, (1807–1894), born in Fincastle, Union Army general
 Joseph R. Anderson, (1813–1892), born in Fincastle, Confederate Army general and iron manufacturer
 John Strother Griffin (1816–1898), physician and land developer, Los Angeles, California
 William Radford (1808–1890), Union Navy officer and later Admiral

References

Towns in Botetourt County, Virginia
County seats in Virginia
Populated places established in 1772
1772 establishments in Virginia